Shahriar Komol (born 6 July 1995) is a Bangladeshi cricketer. He made his List A debut for Khelaghar Samaj Kallyan Samity in the 2018–19 Dhaka Premier Division Cricket League on 1 April 2019. He made his Twenty20 debut on 11 June 2021, for Khelaghar Samaj Kallyan Samity in the 2021 Dhaka Premier Division Twenty20 Cricket League.

References

External links
 

1995 births
Living people
Bangladeshi cricketers
City Club cricketers
Khelaghar Samaj Kallyan Samity cricketers
Place of birth missing (living people)